Uncommon Good is the debut studio album from Canadian electro-soul band Busty and the Bass. It was released on September 8, 2017, by Indica Records. The album's title comes from the band's relationship with their fans, and how music "has a beautiful ability to bring people together and raise their spirits regardless of what else is going on either with them personally or in the world".

Singles
The album's lead single "Up Top" was released on January 19, 2017. Its second single, "Memories and Melodies", came out on April 5, 2017. The final two singles, "Common Ground" and "Closer" were made available on June 30, 2017 and August 25, 2017, respectively.

Production
Busty and the Bass spent nearly two years writing and recording the album. Compared to the band’s earlier releases, Uncommon Good was crafted as a body of work, and less as a collection of songs. The album was mixed and executive produced by Neal Pogue, who is known for his work with acts like OutKast, Lil Wayne, Earth, Wind & Fire, Snoop Dogg, Nicki Minaj, and Aretha Franklin. When asked about the record's theme, Ferraro remarked, "The album ended up accidentally being the roadmap of our growth and change. It starts with a playful side from our days fresh out of school and ends on some more introspective tones as we tried to figure out the real world."

Uncommon Good was entirely recorded at the Indica Records studio. When speaking to WithGuitars, Blu stated, "Uncommon Good represents a much more developed and mature version of our sound. It saw us moving away from the home-basement tracking that we did ourselves to a more encompassing studio environment." The band's songwriting process varied from song to song, but generally started with one or two band members composing a piece of music that would later be shared with everyone else.

Release
The album was officially announced by the band on June 30, 2017. On September 8, 2017, Busty and the Bass released Uncommon Good.

Track listing
All tracks written and recorded by Busty and the Bass.

Personnel
Album credits adapted from the liner notes of Uncommon Good.

Busty and the Bass

 Scott Bevins – trumpet
 Alistair Blu – vocals, keyboard, synthesizer
 Nick Ferraro – vocals, alto saxophone, flute
 Eric Haynes – piano, keyboard
 Milo Johnson – bass, cello
 Mike McCann – trumpet
 Louis Stein – guitar, banjo
 Julian Trivers – drums, percussion
 Chris Vincent – trombone, trumpet, engineer

Additional personnel

 Peter Edward – engineer
 Brian Gardner – mastering
 Neal Pogue – mixing, executive producer
 Patrick Steele – engineer
 Jesse String – engineer

Artwork

 Sarah Ives – album artwork
 Juliana Bergen – photography

References

External links 

2017 debut albums